Senato della Repubblica is an Italian TV channel dedicated to broadcast live coverage of Italian Senate from Palazzo Madama in Rome, Italy.

References

Free-to-air
Television channels and stations established in 2003
RAI television channels
Commercial-free television networks
Legislature broadcasters
Italian-language television stations